The FIVB Volleyball Girls' U19 World Championship is the world championship of volleyball for female players under the age of 19 organized by Fédération Internationale de Volleyball (FIVB).

The first edition was staged in 1989 in Curitiba, Brazil and tournaments have been played every two years since then. The most recent tournament was hosted by Mexico in Durango City and won by Russia.

On 22 March 2022, the FIVB Board of Administration decides to change the age category of the tournament by moving it from U18 to U19 in order to equate it with the Boys' U19 World Championship.

China is the most successful nation in the tournament's history, with four titles and one runner-up. Brazil is the second most successful with three titles and four runners-up.

A corresponding tournament for male players is the FIVB Volleyball Boys' U19 World Championship.

Results summary

Medals summary

Appearance

Legend
 – Champions
 – Runners-up
 – Third place
 – Fourth place
 – Did not enter / Did not qualify
 – Hosts
Q – Qualified for forthcoming tournament

MVP by edition

1989–95 – Not awarded
1997 – 
1999–2001 – Not awarded
2003 – 
2005 – 
2007 – 
2009 – 

2011 – 
2013 – 
2015 – 
2017 – 
2019 – 
2021 –

See also

 FIVB Volleyball Boys' U19 World Championship
 FIVB Volleyball Women's World Championship
 FIVB Volleyball Women's U23 World Championship
 FIVB Volleyball Women's U21 World Championship

Notes

References

External links
 FIVB Girls' Youth Volleyball World Championship Honours

 
V
International women's volleyball competitions
Youth volleyball
Volleyball
Biennial sporting events